Rain is the 17th studio album by Joe Jackson, released in 2008. It was released by Rykodisc on 28 January 2008 in the UK and one day later in the U.S.

Jackson plays piano and sings, and Graham Maby on bass and David Houghton on drums are the only other musicians.  It was recorded at Planet Roc in Berlin, Germany.  A limited edition version of the album included a CD and a bonus DVD containing over 40 minutes of material, including concert and behind-the-scenes footage and interviews. Jackson performed a full UK tour.

Track listing
All songs written, arranged and produced by Joe Jackson.

A bonus DVD with the album contained the following video recordings:
 Live from Islington Academy, London: "Invisible Man", "Wasted Time" and "Good Bad Boy"
 Making the Record
 Interviews
 Jackson's Guide to Berlin

Personnel
 Musicians
 Joe Jackson – piano, vocals
 Graham Maby – bass, vocals
 David Houghton – drums, vocals

 Production
 Joe Jackson - arrangements, producer
 Julie Gardner - recording engineer
 Yensin Jahn - assistant recording engineer
 Sean Slade, Paul Kolderie - mixing engineer
 Ted Young - assistant mixing engineer
 Bob Ludwig - mastering engineer
 Ed Sherman - art direction
 Jim Rakete - photography

Charts

References

External links 
 Rain album information at The Joe Jackson Archive

2008 albums
Joe Jackson (musician) albums
Rykodisc albums